El Oro is one of the 39 municipalities of Durango, in north-western Mexico. The municipal seat lies at Santa María del Oro. The municipality covers an area of 10,041 km².

As of 2010, the municipality had a total population of 11,320, up from 10,501 as of 2005.

The municipality had 113 localities, the largest of which (with 2010 population in parentheses) was: Santa María del Oro (5,878), classified as urban.

References

Municipalities of Durango